Arvada High School is a public secondary school operated by Jefferson County School District R-1 in Arvada, Colorado, United States.

Demographics
Arvada High's student body has the following racial demographics:

History
The first high school classes in Arvada commenced in 1900 at Zephyr and Grandview. Known as the Arvada School (it was renamed Lawrence Elementary School in 1955), local high school students attended classes there until a permanent high school was built in 1920. The first Arvada High School was located at 7225 Ralston Road and served students until 1955. The building served as a junior high school until 1984 and was demolished in 1986. A new building at 5751 Balsam Street served students until 1971, when the school's current building was completed at 7951 W. 65th Avenue and the Balsam Street location became Arvada Junior High School.

In the early 1920s, the school adopted the team name "Redskins". This was challenged in 1993 as derogatory and the new name "Reds" was adopted by a 2–1 margin in voting. The school subsequently adopted a bulldog as its new mascot.

Curriculum
Since 2006, Arvada High School has been home to the district's North Area Option School, a rigorous college preparatory program. Many advanced placement classes are also available. Program classes are taught by Arvada High School instructors and 50% of the available enrollment is for Arvada High students.

Extracurricular activities
Arvada High School fields teams in interscholastic competition in baseball, basketball, cross country, golf, soccer, softball, swimming, diving, tennis, track and field, volleyball and wrestling.

The school's percussion ensemble was the winner of the WGI World Percussion Championships in 1998).

Notable alumni

 Tagg Bozied (1997), professional baseball player
 Joanne Conte
 Joe Decamillis (1983), American Football Coach, Special Teams Coordinator (Denver Broncos)
 Cliff Olander,  player of gridiron football
 Chris Sanders (1980), animator, co-director of Lilo & Stitch
Barclay F Corbus class of 84. 
Director of overstock.com
Senior V.P. Clean Energy Fuels
And more.

References

External links

Educational institutions established in 1900
Public high schools in Colorado
Jefferson County Public Schools (Colorado)
Arvada, Colorado
Schools in Jefferson County, Colorado
1900 establishments in Colorado